The M39 series 5-ton 6×6 truck (G744) was a family of heavy tactical trucks built for the United States Armed Forces. In on-road service the load weight was doubled. 

The M39 series was the primary heavy truck of the U.S. Army and U.S. Marine forces during the Vietnam War, and was also used by the U.S. Navy, U.S. Air Force, and ARVN forces.

The M39 Series began to be replaced by the M809 series in 1970, followed by the M939 series in 1982, but continues to serve in other nations' armed forces around the world.

History

The M39 (G744) series was designed as a 5-ton (4536  kg), three-axle all-wheel-drive off-road truck to replace World War II-era trucks such as 4- and 6-ton 6×6s built by Brockway, Diamond T, Mack, and White. Rushed into production by International Harvester in 1951, soon Kaiser (renamed Kaiser-Jeep in 1963) also became a major manufacturer, with Diamond T and Mack building smaller numbers. The M39 series evolved into the M809 (G908) series in 1969, which followed, but did not replace, it. The M809 Series was then improved into the M939 series.

Specifications

Engine 
The M39 series were originally powered by a Continental R6602 engine, a  overhead valve inline 6 cylinder gasoline engine developing  at 2800 rpm. The -A1 upgrade had a Mack ENDT-673, a  turbocharged inline 6 cylinder diesel engine developing  at 2100 rpm. The -A2 upgrade had a Continental LDS-465-1A, a  turbocharged inline 6 cylinder multifuel engine developing  at 2100 rpm.

Gas engine models have a down-swept exhaust exiting from under the body just ahead of the righthand front set of rear wheels. Diesel (-A1) and multifuel (-A2) models have a vertical exhaust stack and air cleaner on the right fender, however a very small number of the earliest -A1 models and some -A2 gas/multifuel conversions are seen with same style of downswept exhaust as on gas models. Of important note, A2's with a factory build date prior 1964 originally were gas engine models. Most of these conversions received the overdrive-5th transmission found in "pure" -A1 and "pure" -A2 models. However, some converts retained their original gas model direct-5th transmission which gave closer gear ratios but a top speed of only 45 mph with a multifuel due to the lower top rpm allowed on that engine compared to a gas engine.

Driveline 
All M39s had a Spicer 5-speed manual transmission. Gasoline trucks had a “low” 1st gear and direct 5th. Diesel and multifuel trucks had a different model with a ”low” 1st, direct 4th, and overdrive 5th. A 2-speed transfer case engaged the front axle automatically if the rear axles slipped and moved faster than the front axle. Timken axles were used. Gas models had a 6.44:1 final drive gear ratio except for the M129 C/D, which  had a 10.26:1

Chassis
The M39 series had a ladder frame with three live beam axles, the front on leaf springs, the rear tandem on leaf springs with locating arms. There were three chassis wheelbases (measurements are from the centerline of the front axle to the centerline of rear tandem). There was also an M139 heavy duty extra long chassis for extreme service, including the Honest John rocket launcher truck.

Many M39 series were equipped with a front-mounted  Garwood winch, intended for self-recovery.

The M39 series had both single- and dual-rear-tire models; very few single-rear-tire trucks were built. Most models had 11.00×20s with dual rear tires; tractor wreckers had larger 12.00×20s. Bridge trucks and all M139 chassis-based trucks had 14.00×20s.

A standard military cab, designed by REO, was used. It had hinged doors with roll-up windows, a folding windshield, and a removable canvas roof. Cargo trucks and tractors could be fitted with a ring mount for a M2 Browning machine gun. A hard roof could be fitted.

Models

M54 and M55 Cargo Truck 

The M54 was the standard cargo version of the series. It had a  ×  low-sided box with a bottom-hinged tailgate. Side racks, troop seats, and overhead bows with a canvas cover were standard. A front-mounted winch was optional.

The standard body sides could secure a load but could not be loaded from the side by forklifts, so a body with drop sides was standardized as the M54A1C.

The M55, with an extra-long wheelbase, had a  box. By contrast, there was no drop-side version of the M814 successor.

M51 Dump Truck 

The M51 was a dump truck used to haul sand, gravel, dirt, rubble, scrap, and other bulk materials. They could be equipped with overhead bows, tarpaulin, and troop seats, but the relatively small size of the body limited their passenger or cargo load.

M52 Tractor Truck 

Semi-tractor/trailers have to stay on relatively flat ground, and are not rated for full off-road use.

Tractor trucks normally towed a 12-ton, 2-axle trailer. There were stake and platform, van, low-bed, and tanker bodies. Six-ton, 2-axle expansible vans and 6-ton, single-axle vans were also used.

M62 and M543 Medium Wrecker Truck 

The M62 and 543 were wreckers used to recover disabled or stuck trucks and lift large components. The M62 had an Austin Western boom; its replacement, the M543, had one by Garwood. Although the truck was not meant to carry a load, the boom could support  when towing. They had  front and  rear winches, outriggers, boom braces, chocks, block and tackle, oxygen-acetylene torches, and other automotive tools.

M246 Wrecker Tractor Truck 

The M246, with an extra long wheelbase, was a wrecker with a fifth wheel mounted behind the boom. This let the truck perform wrecker duties and to load and tow semi trailers. All had a front and rear winch. Oversize 12.00×20 were used, this was the only model to have this size.

M291 Expansible Van Truck 

The M291 had a  van body with a slide-out section on each side. The body could support  of communications equipment. The M291A1D had a rear power lift gate. None had a front-mounted winch.

M328 Bridge Transporting Stake Truck 

They had a roller on the rear to help unloading and small winches on the side to secure cargo. The stake sides could be removed to carry oversize loads. The largest tires in the series, 14.00x20, were used with dual rear tires.

M748 Bolster Truck 

The M748, with the M796 bolster trailer, was used to carry long loads like logs, poles, and bridge sections. The front of the load was secured to a rotating bolster on the truck and the rear of the load was secured to the trailer. The truck and trailer had a tubular boom that connected them under the load. When the truck was unloaded the trailer could be loaded onto the truck. The truck had a large cab protection rack and both front and mid-mounted winches.

Chassis cabs 
In addition to standardized models, bare chassis cabs were produced for specialty bodies. The largest, the M139C/D, was an Honest John rocket launcher. None had diesel or multi-fuel engines for weight reasons, and they had stronger axles with a lower final drive ratio.

Gun trucks 
Gun trucks were a field expedient, with improvised armor and twin, or M45 Quadmount .50 caliber M2 machine guns.

Dimensions

Gallery

Operators

See also
 G-numbers (SNL G744)
 List of "M" series military vehicles
 M35 2½ ton cargo truck

Notes

References

External links

 M39 series at Olive-Drab.com
 M54 series Technical Manuals at Jatonka

Military trucks of the United States
Military vehicles introduced in the 1950s